Eubulides is a stick insect genus native to the Philippines.

Characteristics 
The representatives of Eubulides are medium-sized, very slender and only slightly or hardly spined Obriminae species. The males reach , the females  in length. The head is flat and, like the pronotum, hardly reinforced or only covered with small tubercles. Only on the frontal margin of the elongated mesonotum spines may be present. There may be a few tubercles on the rear of the mesonotum. The middle femura are clearly toothed, the hind legs very strongly toothed. The secondary ovipositor of the females is designed as a curved laying sting.

Distribution 
The previously known distribution area of the genus includes the Philippine islands Luzon and Mindanao. On Luzon there are representatives in the provinces Ifugao and Nueva Vizcaya, on Mindanao in the Bukidnon province.

Taxonomy 

In 1877, Carl Stål established the genus Eubulides in the first description of Eubulides alutaceus, which became the type species of the genus. The name is dedicated to the Greek philosopher Eubulides. William Forsell Kirby placed the genus 1904 in the subfamily Eurycanthinae, today only considered as tribe Euricanthini. He added a second species to it with the newly written Eubulides spuria, which since 2005 has been regarded as synonym of Dryococelus australis. Josef Redtenbacher continues to treat the genus 1906 as monotypical and includes it in the tribe Obrimini. The only two other species described so far were added in 1939 through descriptions by James Abram Garfield Rehn and his son John William Holman Rehn.

Valid species are:
 Eubulides alutaceus Stål, 1877
 Eubulides igorrote Rehn, J.A.G. & Rehn, J. W. H., 1939
 Eubulides taylori Rehn, J.A.G. & Rehn, J. W. H., 1939

In 2004 Oliver Zompro raised the Obrimini to the rank of a subfamily and divided them into three tribes. One of them was that of the Eubulidini. In addition to the type genus Eubulides, he also placed in this Tisamenus, Ilocano (now synonymous with Tisamenus), Hoploclonia, Stenobrimus, Heterocopus, Pterobrimus and Theramenes. This tribe was withdrawn in 2016 by Frank H. Hennemann et al and is now a synonym for the Obrimini.

In their work on the spread and relationships within the Heteropterygidae, based mainly on genetic analysis, which was published in 2021, Sarah Bank et al also examined samples from five members of the genus Eubulides. Three turned out to be conspecific and were identified as Eubulides igorrote. Two more could not be assigned to any known species and presumably represent new species. Within the Obrimini the genus forms a sister group with a clade from the genera Sungaya, Trachyaretaon and an as yet undescribed Obrimini genus.

Terraristic 
The first and probably only stock of an Eubulides species goes back to specimens that were collected in 2009 by Joachim Bresseel and Thierry Heitzmann in the province Quezon on the island of Luzon. The Phasmid Study Group assigned the PSG number 311 for this stock. The species was initially sexually in breeding, but is probably only kept parthenogenetically. The species affiliation is controversial. Partly it was and is called Eubulides alutaceus, partly as Eubulides igorrote. While the former is a much more robust species than the animals of the breeding stock, Eubulides igorrote has small spines on the pronotum and larger spines on the front edge of the mesonotum, which the breeding stock specimens lack, so that it is apparently an undescribed species. Two to three other breeding stocks known as Eubulides sp. 'Ifugao' or again as Eubulides alutaceus 'Vera Falls' came to Europe, are no longer in breeding.
The stock that is being cultivated needs a high level of humidity and substrate to lay eggs. While the generations that were first bred only ate Araceae, like Epipremnum, they can now be fed with the leaves of bramble or hazel without any problems. The parthenogenetic stock is considered to be easy to keep and to breed.

References

External links 
 
 

Phasmatodea
Phasmatodea genera
Phasmatodea of Asia